Azamat is a Central Asian male given name that means greatness or magnificence and may refer to:

People
 Azamat Abduraimov, Uzbek footballer
 Azamat Balkarov, Russian footballer for FC Angusht Nazran
 Azamat Gonezhukov, Russian footballer for FC Dynamo St. Petersburg
 Azamat Ishenbaev, Kyrgyz footballer
 Azamat Kuliev, Russian painter
 Azamat Kurachinov, Russian footballer for FC Dynamo Stavropol and FC Stavropol beginning in 2007
 Azamat Sydykov, Kyrgyz pianist

Fictional characters
 Azamat Bagatov, a fictional character from the film Borat: Cultural Learnings of America for Make Benefit Glorious Nation of Kazakhstan

See also
Azim